Roseovarius antarcticus is a Gram-negative and aerobic bacterium from the genus Roseovarius which has been isolated from a decayed bone from a whale from the eastern coast of King George Island in Antarctica.

References

External links
Type strain of Roseovarius antarcticus at BacDive -  the Bacterial Diversity Metadatabase

Rhodobacteraceae
Bacteria described in 2015